Stewart Forsyth (born 26 October 1961) is a Scottish footballer, who played for Arbroath, Dundee and  Montrose.

External links

1961 births
Living people
Association football fullbacks
Scottish footballers
Arbroath F.C. players
Dundee F.C. players
Montrose F.C. players
Carnoustie Panmure F.C. players
Scottish Football League players